Phase inversion or phase separation is a chemical phenomenon exploited in the fabrication of artificial membranes. It is performed by removing the solvent from a liquid-polymer solution, leaving a porous, solid membrane.

Process
Phase inversion is a common method to form filtration membranes, which are typically formed using artificial polymers. The method of phase inversion is highly dependent on the type of polymer used and the solvent used to dissolve the polymer.

Phase inversion can be carried out through one of four typical methods:
Reducing the temperature of the solution
Immersing the polymer solution into anti-solvent
Exposing the polymer solution to a vapor of anti-solvent
Evaporating the solvent in atmospheric air or at high temperature

The rate at which phase inversion occurs and the characteristics of the resulting membrane are dependent on several factors, including:
Solubility of solvent in the anti-solvent 
Insolubility of the polymer in the anti-solvent
Temperature of the anti-solvent

Characterization
Phase inversion membranes are typically characterized by their mean pore diameter and pore diameter distribution. This can be measured using a number of established analytical techniques such as the analysis of gas adsorption-desorption isotherms, porosimetry, or more niche approaches such as Evapoporometry. A Scanning electron microscope (SEM) can be used to characterize membranes with larger pore sizes, such as microfiltration and ultrafiltration membranes, while Transmission electron microscopy (TEM) can be used for all membrane types, including small pore membranes such as nanofiltration and reverse osmosis, though optical techniques tend to analyze only a small sample area that may not be representative of the sample as a whole.

In emulsions
 In emulsions a phase inversion is when the dispersed phase becomes the dispersion medium and the dispersion medium becomes the dispersed phase, for example when cream becomes butter.

See also
Membrane
List of synthetic polymers
Microfiltration
Ultrafiltration
Nanofiltration
Reverse Osmosis
Hollow fiber membrane

References

Polymer chemistry